Mohammadabad-e Gazuiyeh (also Romanized as Moḩammadābād-e Gazū’īyeh; also known as Moḩammadābād) is a village in Negar Rural District, in the Central District of Bardsir County, Kerman Province, Iran. At the 2006 census, its population was 12, in 7 families.

References 

Populated places in Bardsir County